Andrea Dovizioso (born 23 March 1986) is an Italian former professional motorcycle racer. He raced with WithU Yamaha RNF MotoGP Team for the 2022 season but announced his intended-retirement after the Misano round in September. 

Dovizioso is one of the most successful modern MotoGP riders with 15 victories and 62 podiums. 
He made his debut in MotoGP in 2008 and immediately finished 5th in the standings as the top satellite rider earning a move to the Factory Honda team in 2009. In  Doviziozo recorded his first win in seven years in Malaysia. In 2017, he found the extra pace needed to challenge for the title with six wins throughout the season, but Marc Marquez, who also had six wins, clinched the title in the final round in Valencia. The subsequent 2018 and 2019 seasons proved less successful, even though he managed to win six combined races and finished runner-up yet again to Marquez. Dovizioso left Ducati after the 2020 season due to a breakdown in relations with the team.

Dovizioso finished within the top five in 10 of his first 13 MotoGP seasons and is considered one of the best MotoGP riders to not win the MotoGP World Championship. He is the only rider in history to win a MotoGP race in three different decades – 2000s, 2010s and 2020s. He is nicknamed 'the Professor' due to his calculated riding approach.

Career

Early career
Born in Forlimpopoli, son of Antonio Dovizioso, a Sicilian motorcycle racer, Dovizioso won the 125cc Italian Aprilia Challenge in 2000. In 2001 Dovizioso won the 125cc European Championship and also competed in his first World Championship race at Mugello, in which he retired. During that year he worked with Guido Mancini, a former rider and mechanic who, in the past, had worked with Valentino Rossi and Loris Capirossi. A documentary film about Mancini's career, released in 2016 by director Jeffrey Zani, tells the story of that racing season.

125cc World Championship
In 2002, Dovizioso competed in the 125cc World Championship with Team Scot Honda, finishing 16th in the final standings. His best results were two 9th places in Le Mans and Donington. He continued with the team in 2003, finishing 5th in the final standings and achieving four podium finishes. The 2004 season saw him pick up five victories and six other podium finishes on his way to winning the championship with 293 points.

250cc World Championship

In 2005 Dovizioso moved to the 250cc class, continuing with Team Scot Honda. The season included five podium finishes and 3rd place in the overall standings. He also won the Rookie of the Year award. In 2006 he remained with the team, who were now renamed as Humangest Racing. He won two races in Barcelona and Estoril and finished on the podium 11 times. He fought for the championship until the final race of the season, but had to settle for 2nd place behind Jorge Lorenzo. The 2007 season saw him win two races in Istanbul and Donington and challenge once again for the championship, but he finished in 2nd place once again.

MotoGP World Championship

Scot Racing Team (2008)

On 15 September 2007, Dovizioso announced that he would be making the move up to the MotoGP class with his existing team in 2008. On his premier class debut, Dovizioso achieved a highly credible fourth place, at the season opener in Qatar, passing Valentino Rossi on the final lap. Throughout the season, Dovi was one of the most consistent Honda riders, placing 4th and 5th several times, and achieving a 3rd place podium finish at the Malaysian MotoGP at Sepang. Dovizioso finished 5th in the final standings.

Repsol Honda Team (2009–2011)

For the  season, Dovizioso became an official Repsol Honda rider replacing Nicky Hayden and partnering Spain's Dani Pedrosa. In July 2009, Dovizioso won his first race in MotoGP at the British Grand Prix in wet conditions at Donington Park. Despite otherwise consistent points finishes, Dovizioso ended up with fewer points than in his début season in the class, finishing sixth in the final standings.

Dovizioso had a strong start to his second season with the Repsol Honda team, picking up a podium in the season-opening race in Qatar. Three more podiums followed early in the year before his results tailed off mid-season. Despite this, Dovizioso consistently collected points finishes and claimed his first pole position in MotoGP at the Japanese Grand Prix at Twin Ring Motegi. He went on to finish second in the race after challenging for the race win, equalling his result from the British Grand Prix. Dovizioso again finished second in the following race in Malaysia. Dovizioso retired in Australia, and concluded the season with third in Portugal and fifth in Valencia to finish fifth in the final championship standings.

Dovizioso started the season well, with a fourth place in Qatar after a race-long battle with Marco Simoncelli. At Jerez, Dovizioso experienced severe tyre wear and had to make a tyre change on his way to 12th place in the damp conditions. He took fourth place in Portugal, with a late-race pass on Valentino Rossi, before Le Mans saw Dovizioso's best performance of the season to that point. Having circulated in sixth for a portion of the race, he was helped by the collision between Pedrosa and Simoncelli, which saw Pedrosa crash out and Simoncelli given a ride-through penalty. He then passed Jorge Lorenzo and Rossi en route to a second-place finish. Fourth place followed in Catalunya, before another second place in Great Britain, having started fifth and led the first few laps before being overtaken by teammate Stoner. Dovizioso extended his podium run to four races after third in the Netherlands and second at his home race at Mugello.

He finished second for the fourth time in 2011, in the Czech Republic; holding off pressure from Simoncelli. Two fifth places followed, before Dovizioso's only retirement of the season in Aragon, after crashing out. Dovizioso finished fifth in Japan, despite a ride-through penalty for jumping the start. Dovizioso finished third in Australia and Valencia, while the Malaysian race was cancelled after the death of Simoncelli in the first attempt to run the race.

He ended the season third behind Jorge Lorenzo and Casey Stoner, but decided to move to the Tech3 Yamaha team for the  season, alongside Cal Crutchlow on a one-year deal. Dovizioso moved to the team after rejecting the offer of a satellite Honda bike, after Repsol Honda reverted to two bikes – for Stoner and Pedrosa – for the 2012 season.

Monster Yamaha Tech3 (2012)
Dovizioso achieved top-five placings in each of his first three starts for Tech3, with fifth places in Qatar and at Jerez, as well as a fourth place at the Portuguese Grand Prix. A seventh place followed at Le Mans, before his first podium of the season – a third place – at the Catalan Grand Prix. After missing out on points at the British Grand Prix due to a crash, Dovizioso finished third or fourth in each of the next six races – with four podiums – to maintain fourth place in the championship ahead of teammate Crutchlow.

He won the Supermoto-Race on SIC Supermoto Day together with Mauno Hermunen, a race in honour of the memory of his compatriot Marco Simoncelli, who died in a race crash in 2011.

Ducati Team (2013–2020)

Following Valentino Rossi's move back to the factory Yamaha team, Dovizioso was signed by Ducati to replace Rossi in their factory team. Dovizioso had a difficult season on an under-performing Ducati Desmosedici, with a best place of fourth in wet conditions at the French Grand Prix. He ended the season eighth, behind Stefan Bradl and just ahead of teammate Nicky Hayden.

The season started in a positive way for Dovizioso, as he obtained three top-five results in the first four races, including a third place in the Grand Prix of the Americas in Texas and claimed his first pole position with Ducati in Japan, his first pole position since . He ended the season fifth in the riders' championship.

Dovizioso remained at Ducati for a third successive season, where he was joined by fellow Italian rider, Andrea Iannone, who moved from Pramac Racing. He took the first pole position of the season in Qatar, out-qualifying the rest of the field by 0.2 seconds. In the race, he started well and battled with the factory Yamahas of Valentino Rossi and Jorge Lorenzo. He finished in second place behind Rossi, taking his first podium since the Dutch TT in June 2014. Teammate Iannone finished just behind in third place, giving the factory team their first double podium finish since the 2010 Aragon Grand Prix. In the following two races, he finished in second position. However, Dovizioso's form took a huge dip as he struggled with mechanical and crashes. Having scored 4 podiums from the first 5 races, he only added 1 more to his total for the rest of the season. He finished seventh in the championship.

Dovizioso started the season strongly in Qatar again, finishing 2nd, but was taken out by his teammate in the Argentine Grand Prix when he was 2nd, he ultimately limped over to finish 13th. He was taken out by Pedrosa in Austin while 3rd and had a water pump failure in Jerez to leave him well down the standings. Around this time it was announced that Jorge Lorenzo would be joining Ducati for 2017. A few weeks later Ducati announced that Dovizioso was to stay at Ducati to partner Lorenzo, while Iannone signed a contract with the Suzuki team. In the inaugural Austrian Grand Prix, where Ducati were favourites to win, he finished 2nd to his teammate Iannone, which left disappointed. However he finished the season strongly and took only his 2nd MotoGP win in the Malaysian Grand Prix ahead of Valentino Rossi and Jorge Lorenzo, his first win in 7 years. He finished the season fifth in the championship.

Once again, Dovizioso started the season by finishing 2nd in Qatar, this time to new factory Yamaha rider, Maverick Vinales. He was taken out again in Argentina, this time by Aleix Espargaro, before finishing 6th, 5th, and 4th in Austin, Jerez and Le Mans, however Ducati was pretty far behind the winner in those races. At the Italian Grand Prix, Dovizioso looked strong throughout practice and qualified 3rd behind Vinales and Rossi. He controlled the pace in the race, didn't let Vinales get away and ultimately passed him and opened up a gap to win the race, becoming the first Italian rider to win the Italian Grand Prix on a Ducati motorcycle. It was also his first dry MotoGP victory. 7 days later in Catalunya, he astonishingly managed to win the race again, having started 7th, ahead of Marquez, Pedrosa and his teammate. Back to back wins for Dovizioso put him only 7 points behind Vinales at the top of the standings, though he had talked down the possibility of a title fight. With Vinales crashing in Assen, he took the lead of the championship. However, a series of mediocre results in Assen, Sachsenring and Brno put him down to 3rd in the standings. He again took back-to-back wins in Austria and Great Britain, retaking the lead as Marquez retired due to blown engine. At the San Marino grand prix, he finished third and a 7th position at Aragon saw him lose the title lead to Marc Marquez once again. At the Japanese GP however, he took his fifth win of the season after passing Marquez on the final lap, reducing the deficit to 11 points. In the final round in Valencia Dovizioso struggled,  qualifying only 9th. Despite getting a tow from teammate Jorge Lorenzo, he ultimately crashed out of the race from 4th place with 5 laps remaining. He finished the season 2nd, losing the world championship battle to Marc Marquez, with total of 6 wins.

Dovizioso took victory in the season opener in Qatar, beating Marc Márquez to the line. In total, he won 4 races in the 2018 MotoGP season (Qatar, Czech Republic, San Marino, and Valencia) with a total of 9 podium finishes, ultimately finishing the championship as runner-up to Márquez for the second season in a row, with 245 points.

Dovizioso won at Qatar for the second year in a row and in Austria with a final corner overtake on Marc Márquez. He suffered a large accident at the British Grand Prix, where he was unable to avoid the low-siding Fabio Quartararo in front of him, running over the French rider's bike, sending Dovizioso airborne and falling head-first to the ground heavily. The accident caused him to have memory loss temporarily, which he would fully recover from. He scored 9 podium finishes in the season, equalling his tally from the previous season. With 269 points – his highest career tally to date – Dovizioso finished 2nd to Márquez for the third consecutive season.

In 2020, Dovizioso remained with Ducati. He achieved a third place podium finish at the season opener in Spain. Citing the deterioration of the working relationship between himself and Ducati – particularly team principal Gigi Dall'Igna – and Ducati's lack of commitment to a new contract, Dovizioso made a surprise announcement ahead of qualifying at the Austrian Grand Prix that he would leave Ducati at the end of the season. He went on to win the race the following day, in what would turn out to be his 14th and final victory with the Italian manufacturer. He finished the season in fourth place overall with 135 points, as the top Ducati rider for the fifth consecutive season.

Sabbatical
By the end of 2020, with no other immediate prospects, Dovizioso elected to take a sabbatical year in 2021 with his sights set on returning to racing for 2022. In early 2021, he was announced as a test rider for Aprilia Racing Team Gresini, with hopes of a potential race seat with the manufacturer for the following season, and he completed a number of test days.

Ultimately, the 2022 seat went to Spanish rider Maverick Viñales, who started with Aprilia early in September 2021, closing the door for Dovizioso with the Noale manufacturer.

Return with Petronas Yamaha SRT (2021)
Dovizioso was reported to have joined Petronas Yamaha by the British GP weekend, after Maverick Viñales left the Factory Yamaha Team and went to Aprilia Racing Team Gresini for the rest of 2021. That was later confirmed in the week leading up to the  San Marino Grand Prix. Dovizioso will join Valentino Rossi for the rest of 2021, replacing Franco Morbidelli who moves up to the Factory team.

WithU Yamaha RNF MotoGP Team (2022)
Dovisioso returned to the rebranded WithU Yamaha RNF MotoGP satellite team, partnering with Darryn Binder. He was replaced by Cal Crutchlow after retiring from MotoGP at the end of the San Marino Grand Prix.

Auto racing career
Dovizioso made his debut in auto racing when he participated in 2016 Lamborghini Super Trofeo at Circuit Ricardo Tormo round, driving a Lamborghini Huracán. He finished 4th in the first race in the Pro-Am class and won the second race.

It was announced in May 2019 that Dovizioso would take part in the Misano round of the 2019 DTM championship, driving an Audi RS5 Turbo DTM for W Racing Team (WRT). He raced as a substitute driver for Pietro Fittipaldi, who was briefly loaned to Team Rosberg from WRT as Jamie Green was absent due to appendicitis recovery. He qualified 15th for the first race and finished 12th, and started from 14th to finish 15th in the second race.

Career statistics

Grand Prix motorcycle racing

By season

By class

Races by year
(key) (Races in bold indicate pole position, races in italics indicate fastest lap)

Complete Lamborghini Super Trofeo Europe results

Complete Deutsche Tourenwagen Masters results
(key) (Races in bold indicate pole position) (Races in italics indicate fastest lap)

References

External links

 

1986 births
Living people
People from Forlimpopoli
People of Sicilian descent
Italian motorcycle racers
Ducati Corse MotoGP riders
Repsol Honda MotoGP riders
250cc World Championship riders
125cc World Championship riders
Tech3 MotoGP riders
MotoGP World Championship riders
Italian racing drivers
Deutsche Tourenwagen Masters drivers
Sepang Racing Team MotoGP riders
RNF Racing MotoGP riders
Sportspeople from the Province of Forlì-Cesena
W Racing Team drivers
Audi Sport drivers
125cc World Riders' Champions